Volf is both a surname and a given name. It may refer to:

Karen Volf (1864–1946), Danish baker and pastry cook
Jaroslav Volf (born 1979), Czech slalom canoeist
Josef Volf (born 1939), Czech cyclist
Miroslav Volf (born 1956), Croatian theologian
Volf Roitman (1930–2010), Uruguayan painter, sculptor and architect